Andrew Whiteford (born 22 August 1977) is a Scottish professional footballer and manager.

A defender, Whiteford began his career with St Johnstone in 1994 after progressing through the McDiarmid Park youth ranks. In six years as a professional with the Perth club he made seventeen league appearances.

Whiteford went on loan to Stirling Albion during the 1999-2000 season, and he made the move permanent in 2000. In total, he made 30 league appearances for Albion, scoring one goal.

In 2001, he joined Clydebank, for whom he made fourteen appearances in two years.

His most recent club, between 2003 and 2004, was Hamilton Academical. He made seventeen appearances and scored two goals for the Accies.

External links 

1977 births
Living people
Scottish footballers
St Johnstone F.C. players
Stirling Albion F.C. players
Clydebank F.C. (1965) players
Hamilton Academical F.C. players
Scottish Football League players
Scottish Premier League players
Scottish Junior Football Association players
Association football defenders
Scotland under-21 international footballers
Scottish football managers